Roger Rubini (born 25 January 1920) was a Swiss weightlifter. He competed at the 1948 Summer Olympics and the 1952 Summer Olympics.

References

External links
 

1920 births
Possibly living people
Swiss male weightlifters
Olympic weightlifters of Switzerland
Weightlifters at the 1948 Summer Olympics
Weightlifters at the 1952 Summer Olympics
Place of birth missing